Lunitik Muzik is the second studio album by American hip hop duo Luniz. It was released on November 11, 1997 through Noo Trybe/C-Note Records. Production was handled by Tone Capone, Mike Dean, Bosko, Quincy Jones III, Raphael Saadiq, Redman and Smoke One Productions. It features guest appearances from Poppa LQ, 2 Live Crew, 3X Krazy, 8Ball & MJG, B-Legit, Brownstone, Christión, E-40, Harm, Madd Maxx, MoKenStef, Phats Bossi, Redman, Swoop G, TK Kirkland, Too $hort, Val Young, DJ Thump & Mengesha. The album peaked at number 34 on the Billboard 200.

Track listing

Charts

References

External links

1997 albums
Luniz albums
Albums produced by Bosko
Albums produced by G-One
Albums produced by DJ Quik
Albums produced by Raphael Saadiq
Albums produced by Quincy Jones III
Albums produced by Mike Dean (record producer)